Luzna may refer to the following places:

Lužná (Rakovník District), a village in the Central Bohemian Region of the Czech Republic
Łużna, Lesser Poland Voivodeship, southern Poland
Lūžņa, a village in Latvia